Trigg may refer to:

People

Surnames
 Abram Trigg (1750 – c. 1813), U.S. Congressman from Virginia
 Connally Findlay Trigg (1847–1907), American soldier and politician
 Connally Findlay Trigg (judge) (1810–1880), jurist
 Cyril Trigg (1917–1993), footballer
 Frank Trigg (born 1972), American mixed martial artist
 Henry Trigg (1791–1882), public servant
 Henry Trigg (testator) (c. 1667–1724), British grocer famous for his eccentric will
 John Johns Trigg (1748–1804), American farmer, U.S. Congressman from Virginia
 Johnny Trigg (born 1938), American BBQ chef
 Lloyd Allan Trigg (1914–1943), New Zealand pilot of WW2, awarded the Victoria Cross
 Mary K. Trigg, professor
 Michael Trigg, American football player
 Noel Trigg, (born 1938), British boxer
 Robert C. Trigg (1830–1872), Confederate colonel
 Roy Trigg (born 1943), motorcycle rider
 Stephen Trigg (c. 1744–1782), American pioneer and soldier in Kentucky
 Stephanie Trigg, literary scholar

Given names
 Trigg H. Knutson (1879-1952), American businessman and politician

Places
 Trigg, Western Australia, a suburb of Perth, Australia
 Triggshire, an ancient hundred of Cornwall; also known as Trigg
 Trigg County, Kentucky, United States

Other
 John Trigg Ester Library, in Ester, Alaska, United States
 William R. Trigg Company, an inland shipyard in Richmond, Virginia, United States, circa 1900

See also
 Triggs (disambiguation)
 Trygg (disambiguation)